Speed skating at the 1986 Asian Winter Games took place in Makomanai Skating Centre Sapporo in the city of Sapporo, Japan with nine events contested – five for men and four for women.

Schedule

Medalists

Men

Women

Medal table

Participating nations
A total of 45 athletes from 5 nations competed in speed skating at the 1986 Asian Winter Games:

References
 Results

External links
 Results of the First Winter Asian Games

 
1986 Asian Winter Games events
1986
Asian Games
Asian Games